The Dive is a 2018 Israeli drama film directed by Yona Rozenkier. The film premiered at the 2018 Jerusalem Film Festival. It was later screened in the Contemporary World Cinema section at the 2018 Toronto International Film Festival.

Cast

References

External links
 

2018 films
2018 drama films
Israeli drama films
2010s Hebrew-language films